Celestrina is a settlement on the left bank of the Drava River in northeastern Slovenia in the City Municipality of Maribor.

References

External links
Celestrina on Geopedia

Populated places in the City Municipality of Maribor